Paula Cristina Gonçalves and Sanaz Marand were the defending champions, but chose not to participate together. Gonçalves partnered Verónica Cepede Royg, while Marand partnered Melanie Oudin, but both pairs lost in the first round.

Michaëlla Krajicek and Maria Sanchez won the title, defeating Elise Mertens and Mandy Minella in the final, 6–2, 6–4.

Seeds

Draw

References 
 Draw

Coleman Vision Tennis Championships - Doubles